The Electro-Dynamic Company manufactured electric motors and generators 1880–2000, principally as a subsidiary of the Electric Boat Division of General Dynamics and its predecessors.

History
The company was founded by electrical inventor William Woodnut Griscom in 1880. An important early customer for electric boat motors was the Electric Launch Company, also known as Elco. Following an 1892 bankruptcy, financier Isaac Rice bailed out Electro-Dynamic and became a co-owner. Griscom died in a hunting accident in 1897. In 1899, Rice founded Electric Boat and made Electro-Dynamic and Elco subsidiaries of it. Electro-Dynamic relocated from Philadelphia to Bayonne, New Jersey at some point prior to 1964, with a plant on Avenue A. In 1964 a fire destroyed this plant and the company acquired a facility in Avenel, New Jersey, formerly occupied by Security Steel. In the 20th century the company manufactured electric motors and generators for numerous submarines built by Electric Boat as well as naval and civilian boats built by Elco. The company retained this function as a division of General Dynamics Corporation when that company was formed by a reorganization of Electric Boat in 1952. The company was dissolved in 2000 and its functions were relocated to Electric Boat's main facility in Groton, Connecticut.

See also
Electric Launch Company sister company 
 New London Ship and Engine Company sister company to  
 Submarine Boat Company sister company

References

External links
Article on General Dynamics' website on closure of Electro-Dynamic

American companies established in 1880
Defunct manufacturing companies based in Pennsylvania
Defunct manufacturing companies based in New Jersey